Walls House may refer to:

Walls Farm Barn and Corn Crib, Tomberlin, Arkansas, listed on the NRHP in Arkansas
Walls House (Lonoke, Arkansas), listed on the NRHP in Arkansas
James A. Walls House, Holly Grove, Arkansas, listed on the NRHP in Arkansas